His Excellency Abdullah al-Roumi was Deputy Prime Minister of the State of Kuwait, Minister of Justice and
Supreme Attorney General. Kuwait has never appointed a Deputy Prime Minister outside the Royal Family until April 2021 when Abdullah al-Roumi was appointed. 
Although the al-Roumi family do not rule Kuwait; they are one of the most high level and wealthy families in the oil rich country. Prior to 2021; he was a member of the Kuwaiti National Assembly from the first district. Born in 1949, al-Roumi worked as a lawyer before being elected to the National Assembly in 1985.  Al-Roumi is considered an independent, liberal-leaning member.

Pro Gun Control
In February 2005, in the wake of a wave of Al-Qaeda violence, the parliament unanimously passed a law giving police wide powers to search for and seize illegal weapons.  Al-Roumi was one of the main proponents of the bill, which makes it easier for police to obtain a warrant to search a private house for illegal weapons.  The law also allows female inspectors to search women's quarters in private homes—quarters which are off limits to men according to Islamic rules.
The parliament passed a similar law in 1992 to deal with a jump in gun ownership after the 1990 invasion of Kuwait. Lawmakers refused to extend that law in 1994, arguing that possession of weapons was a right.

Allegations Against Oil Minister Sheik Ali Al Jarrah Al Sabah
In June 2007, al-Roumi, Adel Al-Saraawi, and Musallam Al-Barrak led impeachment proceedings against Oil Minister Sheik Ali Al Jarrah Al Sabah on charges of corruption.  Al-Roumi alleged that Sheik Ali intimidated a witness in the case. The minister swore that he called the witness for a meeting to tell him to provide all the information he has in the case.  Sheik Ali resigned on June 27, after being publicly questioned and before a no-confidence vote could be held.

During the impeachment proceedings, al-Roumi also made the following public statement against Sheik Ali: "You have to submit your resignation today because what you said has humiliated the Kuwaiti people." Sheikh Ali had been quoted by the local Al Qabas newspaper as saying that he considers former oil minister Sheikh Ali Khalifa Al Sabah, a defendant in a major graft case, as "my master and that I consult him occasionally on oil issues."

Campaign to Reform Foreign Worker Sponsorship System
In August 2008, al-Roumi declared that he was going to draft a law to scrap Kuwait's foreign worker sponsorship system, under which expatriates must be sponsored by a local employer to get a work permit:  "The government should be the only kafeel...  We have scores of bachelors residing in Kuwait with an equal number of crimes. Many are caused due to the 'trading with humans' issue which taints the reputation of Kuwait."

Denmark Boycott
In February 2008, al-Roumi called for the Kuwaiti government to boycott Denmark in response to the Jyllands-Posten Muhammad cartoons controversy and was quoted as saying, "No Muslim can accept this insult against the Prophet... It is a form of terrorism."

Support For Female Candidates
In 2008, al-Roumi expressed his support for women's active participation in the legislature.  On May 10, 2008, he spoke at the inauguration of a women's campaign headquarters in the Salwa area.  However, on November 30, 1999, al-Roumi voted against granting women the right to vote.

Runner-Up in Speaker Election
On June 1, 2008, Jassem Al-Kharafi was re-elected National Assembly Speaker on Sunday, after gaining 52 votes against 11 to his opponent, Abdullah al-Roumi.

Supports Government Funds for College Tuition
In 2002 Kuwait started allowing private universities in the country, beginning with the Gulf University for Science and Technology.  On September 28, 2008, MPs Abdullah al-Roumi, Marzouq Al-Ghanem, Ali Al-Rashid, and Adel Al-Saraawi proposed a law to have the government pay half of Kuwaiti students' tuition at these private colleges.

Reforming Mandatory Retirement Age for Teachers
On November 28, 2008, al-Roumi joined MPs Khalid Al-Sultan, Hassan Johar, Musallam Al-Barrak, and Marzouq Al-Hubaini in formulating a bill to extend the mandatory retirement age for Kuwaiti teaching staff at Kuwait University from 65 to 70 years.  Al-Roumi argued that Item 32 of Law no. 15/1979 has denied the country services of able and intelligent academicians by restricting retirement age of Kuwaitis to 65 years. He recommended that a clause be added to the law such that the retirement age can become 70 years and can further be extended to 75 years.

References

External links
Abdullah al-Roumi's website 

1949 births
Living people
Members of the National Assembly (Kuwait)